Neil Jeffrey Collins (born 15 October 1961 in Manchester, England) is a former speedway rider. He once finished runner-up with England in the World Team Cup final.

When Neil retired he had broken the record for domestic appearances (1,132) in British Speedway, overtaking the record previously held by his brother Les Collins (1,084).

2007 would have been his thirtieth season but having not found a team place by the start of the season, due to the reduction in the points limit for team building purposes, he decided to retire.

Family
Neil has four brothers all of whom were speedway riders, Peter, Phil, Les and Stephen. His nephews Aidan and Chris were also riders but have both retired from the sport.

World Final appearances

World Team Cup
 1984 -  Leszno, Alfred Smoczyk Stadium (with Chris Morton / Peter Collins / Simon Wigg / Phil Collins) - 2nd - 24pts (2)

External links
Neil Collins in the Leicester Lions Scrapbook

References 

Living people
1961 births
British speedway riders
English motorcycle racers
Sportspeople from Manchester
Belle Vue Aces riders
Wolverhampton Wolves riders
Workington Comets riders
Edinburgh Monarchs riders
Glasgow Tigers riders
Newport Wasps riders
Sheffield Tigers riders
Somerset Rebels riders
Ellesmere Port Gunners riders
Stoke Potters riders
Hull Vikings riders
Peterborough Panthers riders
Leicester Lions riders
Long Eaton Invaders riders
Swindon Robins riders